15th Anniversary Album is a studio album by Slim Whitman, released in 1967 on Imperial Records.

For this album, Whitman made "newly recorded renditions of the songs synonymous with his name".

Track listing 
The album was issued in the United States and Canada by Imperial Records as a 12-inch long-playing record, catalog numbers LP-9342 (mono) and LP-12342 (stereo).

Charts

References 

1967 albums
Slim Whitman albums
Imperial Records albums